Rebecca Anne Essex (born 16 November 1982) is an English female rugby union player and headteacher. She represented  at the 2010 Women's Rugby World Cup. She was played in the squad to the 2014 Women's Rugby World Cup.

Essex earned her 50th cap in the 2014 Women's Six Nations match against .

In 2017, Essex had retired from the England team but still played for Richmond. She works as the head of an ASD center at Strand on the Green school in Chiswick.

References

External links
Player Profile

1982 births
Living people
England women's international rugby union players
English female rugby union players